Tobias Mayer (17 February 172320 February 1762) was a German astronomer famous for his studies of the Moon.

He was born at Marbach, in Württemberg, and brought up at Esslingen in poor circumstances. A self-taught mathematician, he earned a living by teaching mathematics while still a youth. He had already published two original geometrical works when, in 1746, he entered J. B. Homann's cartographic establishment at Nuremberg. Here he introduced many improvements in mapmaking, and gained a scientific reputation which led (in 1751) to his election to the chair of economy and mathematics at the University of Göttingen. In 1754 he became superintendent of the observatory, where he worked until his death in 1762.

Career
Mayer's first important astronomical work was a careful investigation of the libration of the Moon (Kosmographische Nachrichten, Nuremberg, 1750), and his chart of the full moon (published in 1775) was unsurpassed for half a century. But his fame rests chiefly on his lunar tables, communicated in 1752, with new solar tables to the Königliche Gesellschaft der Wissenschaften zu Göttingen (Royal Society of Sciences at Göttingen), and published in their transactions. In 1755 he submitted to the British government an amended body of manuscript tables, which James Bradley compared with the Greenwich observations. He found these to be sufficiently accurate to determine the Moon's position to 75", and consequently the longitude at sea to about half a degree. An improved set was later published in London (1770), as also the theory (Theoria lunae juxta systema Newtonianum, 1767) upon which the tables are based. His widow, with whom they were sent to England, received in consideration from the British government a grant of £3,000. Appended to the London edition of the solar and lunar tables are two short tracts, one on determining longitude by lunar distances, together with a description of the reflecting circle (invented by Mayer in 1752), the other on a formula for atmospheric refraction, which applies a remarkably accurate correction for temperature.

Legacy
Mayer left behind him a considerable quantity of manuscript material, part of which was collected by G. C. Lichtenberg and published in one volume (Opera inedita, Göttingen, 1775). It contains an easy and accurate method for calculating eclipses, an essay on colour, in which three primary colours are recognized, a catalogue of 998 zodiacal stars, and a memoir, the earliest of any real value, on the proper motion of eighty stars, originally communicated to the Göttingen Royal Society in 1760. The remaining manuscripts included papers on atmospheric refraction from 1755, on the motion of Mars as affected by the perturbations of Jupiter and the Earth (1756), and on terrestrial magnetism (1760 and 1762). In these last Mayer sought to explain the magnetic action of the Earth by a modification of Euler's hypothesis, and made the first really definite attempt to establish a mathematical theory of magnetic action (C. Hansteen, Magnetismus der Erde, I, 283). In 1881 Ernst Klinkerfues published photo-lithographic reproductions of Mayer's local charts and general map of the Moon. His star catalogue was re-edited by Francis Baily in 1830 (Memoirs of the Royal Astronomical Society IV, 391) and by Arthur Auwers in 1894.

Honors: Lunar crater T. Mayer (Southwest of crater Copernicus).

Family
His son Johann Tobias Mayer became a noted German physicist.

Notes

References
 A. G. Kästner, Elogium Tobiae Mayeri (Göttingen, 1762)
Jérôme Lalande, Connaissance des Temps, 1767, p. 187
Monatliche Correspondenz, VIII, 257; IX, 45, 415, 487; XI, 462
Allgemeine Geographische Ephemeriden III, 116, 1799 (portrait)
A. G. Kästner, Berliner Astronomisches Jahrbuch, Suppl. Bd. III, 209, 1797
J. B. J. Delambre, Histoire de l'Astronomie au Dix-huitième Siecle, (Paris, 1827), p. 429
Robert Grant, History of Physical Astronomy from the Earliest Ages to the Middle of the Nineteenth Century (London, 1852), pp. 46, 488, 555
Arthur Berry, A Short History of Astronomy (London, 1898), p. 282
J. S. Pütter, Versuch einer academischen Gelehrten-Geschichte von der Universität zu Gottingen, I, 68
J. Gehler, Physikalisches Wörterbuch neu bearb. von H.W. Brandes [u.a.]. (Leipzig, 1825- ), VI, 746, 1039

Attribution:

Further reading
Eric G. Forbes: Tobias Mayer (1723–1762), pioneer of enlightened science in Germany.  Göttingen: Vandenhoeck & Ruprecht, 1980  German edition as: Tobias Mayer (1723-62), Pionier der Naturwissenschaften der deutschen Aufklärungszeit übers. von Maria Forbes u. Hans-Heinrich Vogt. Marbach am Neckar: Tobias-Mayer-Museum-Verein, 1993 (Schriftenreihe des Tobias-Mayer-Museum-Vereins e.V.; Nr. 17)
Sarah Lowengard, "Tobias Mayer's Trichromatic Graph," The Creation of Color in Eighteenth-Century Europe New York, Columbia University Press, 2006. http://www.gutenberg-e.org/lowengard/A_Chap03.html#31
Tobias Mayer: Tobias Mayer's Opera inedita: the first translation of the Lichtenberg edition of 1775, by Eric G. Forbes.  London: Macmillan, 1971  (American ed.: New York: American Elsevier, 1971 )
Tobias Mayer: The unpublished writings of Tobias Mayer by Eric G. Forbes. Göttingen: Vandenhoeck & Ruprecht, 1972. 3v.  (v. 1);  (v. 2);  (v. 3)  (Arbeiten aus der Niedersächsischen Staats- und Universitätsbibliothek Göttingen; Bd. 9-11)
The Euler-Mayer correspondence, 1751-1755: a new perspective on eighteenth-century advances in the lunar theory, [edited] by Eric G. Forbes.  London: Macmillan, 1971

External links

Entry in the Mathematics Genealogy Project

1723 births
1762 deaths
People from Marbach am Neckar
18th-century German astronomers
Academic staff of the University of Göttingen
People from the Duchy of Württemberg
Selenographers
German scientific instrument makers